In toxicology, the median lethal dose, LD50 (abbreviation for "lethal dose, 50%"), LC50 (lethal concentration, 50%) or LCt50 is a toxic unit that measures the lethal dose of a toxin, radiation, or pathogen. The value of LD50 for a substance is the dose required to kill half the members of a tested population after a specified test duration. LD50 figures are frequently used as a general indicator of a substance's acute toxicity. A lower LD50 is indicative of increased toxicity.

The test was created by J.W. Trevan in 1927. The term semilethal dose is occasionally used in the same sense, in particular with translations of foreign language text, but can also refer to a sublethal dose. LD50 is usually determined by tests on animals such as laboratory mice. In 2011, the U.S. Food and Drug Administration approved alternative methods to LD50 for testing the cosmetic drug Botox without animal tests.

Conventions 
The LD50 is usually expressed as the mass of substance administered per unit mass of test subject, typically as milligrams of substance per kilogram of body mass, sometimes also stated as nanograms (suitable for botulinum), micrograms, or grams (suitable for paracetamol) per kilogram. Stating it this way allows the relative toxicity of different substances to be compared and normalizes for the variation in the size of the animals exposed (although toxicity does not always scale simply with body mass). For substances in the environment, such as poisonous vapors or substances in water that are toxic to fish, the concentration in the environment (per cubic metre or per litre) is used, giving a value of LC50. But in this case, the exposure time is important (see below).

The choice of 50% lethality as a benchmark avoids the potential for ambiguity of making measurements in the extremes and reduces the amount of testing required. However, this also means that LD50 is not the lethal dose for all subjects; some may be killed by much less, while others survive doses far higher than the LD50. Measures such as "LD1" and "LD99" (dosage required to kill 1% or 99%, respectively, of the test population) are occasionally used for specific purposes.

Lethal dosage often varies depending on the method of administration; for instance, many substances are less toxic when administered orally than when intravenously administered. For this reason, LD50 figures are often qualified with the mode of administration, e.g., "LD50 i.v."

The related quantities LD50/30 or LD50/60 are used to refer to a dose that without treatment will be lethal to 50% of the population within (respectively) 30 or 60 days. These measures are used more commonly within radiation health physics, as survival beyond 60 days usually results in recovery.

A comparable measurement is LCt50, which relates to lethal dosage from exposure, where C is concentration and t is time. It is often expressed in terms of mg-min/m3. ICt50 is the dose that will cause incapacitation rather than death. These measures are commonly used to indicate the comparative efficacy of chemical warfare agents, and dosages are typically qualified by rates of breathing (e.g., resting = 10 L/min) for inhalation, or degree of clothing for skin penetration. The concept of Ct was first proposed by Fritz Haber and is sometimes referred to as Haber's law, which assumes that exposure to 1 minute of 100 mg/m3 is equivalent to 10 minutes of 10 mg/m3 (1 × 100 = 100, as does 10 × 10 = 100).

Some chemicals, such as hydrogen cyanide, are rapidly detoxified by the human body, and do not follow Haber's law. So, in these cases, the lethal concentration may be given simply as LC50 and qualified by a duration of exposure (e.g., 10 minutes). The Material Safety Data Sheets for toxic substances frequently use this form of the term even if the substance does follow Haber's law.

For disease-causing organisms, there is also a measure known as the median infective dose and dosage. The median infective dose (ID50) is the number of organisms received by a person or test animal qualified by the route of administration (e.g., 1,200 org/man per oral). Because of the difficulties in counting actual organisms in a dose, infective doses may be expressed in terms of biological assay, such as the number of LD50s to some test animal. In biological warfare infective dosage is the number of infective doses per cubic metre of air times the number of minutes of exposure (e.g., ICt50 is 100 medium doses - min/m3).

Limitation 
As a measure of toxicity, LD50 is somewhat unreliable and results may vary greatly between testing facilities due to factors such as the genetic characteristics of the sample population, animal species tested, environmental factors and mode of administration.

There can be wide variability between species as well; what is relatively safe for rats may very well be extremely toxic for humans (cf. paracetamol toxicity), and vice versa. For example, chocolate, comparatively harmless to humans, is known to be toxic to many animals. When used to test venom from venomous creatures, such as snakes, LD50 results may be misleading due to the physiological differences between mice, rats, and humans. Many venomous snakes are specialized predators on mice, and their venom may be adapted specifically to incapacitate mice; and mongooses may be exceptionally resistant. While most mammals have a very similar physiology, LD50 results may or may not have equal bearing upon every mammal species, such as humans, etc.

Examples 
Note: Comparing substances (especially drugs) to each other by LD50 can be misleading in many cases due (in part) to differences in effective dose (ED50). Therefore, it is more useful to compare such substances by therapeutic index, which is simply the ratio of LD50 to ED50.

The following examples are listed in reference to LD50 values, in descending order, and accompanied by LC50 values, {bracketed}, when appropriate.

Poison scale 

The LD50 values have a very wide range. The botulinum toxin as the most toxic substance known has an LD50 value of 1 ng/kg, while the most non-toxic substance water has an LD50 value of more than 90 g/kg. That's a difference of about 1 in 100 billion or 11 orders of magnitude. As with all measured values that differ by many orders of magnitude, a logarithmic view is advisable. Well-known examples are the indication of the earthquake strength using the Richter scale, the pH value, as a measure for the acidic or basic character of an aqueous solution or of loudness in decibels.
In this case, the negative decimal logarithm of the LD50 values, which is standardized in kg per kg body weight, is considered .

The dimensionless value found can be entered in a toxin scale. Water as the baseline substance is neatly 1 in the negative logarithmic toxin scale.

Animal rights concerns 
Animal-rights and animal-welfare groups, such as Animal Rights International, have campaigned against LD50 testing on animals. Several countries, including the UK, have taken steps to ban the oral LD50, and the Organisation for Economic Co-operation and Development (OECD) abolished the requirement for the oral test in 2001 (see Test Guideline 401, Trends in Pharmacological Sciences Vol 22, February 22, 2001).

See also 
 Animal testing
 Reed-Muench method
 The dose makes the poison – the toxicology adage that high quantities of any substance is lethal

Other measures of toxicity 

 IDLH
 Certain safety factor
 Therapeutic index
 Protective index
 Fixed Dose Procedure to estimate LD50
 Median toxic dose (TD50)
 Lowest published lethal dose (LDLo)
 EC50 (half maximal effective concentration)
 IC50 (half maximal inhibitory concentration)
 Draize test
 Indicative limit value
 No-observed-adverse-effect level (NOAEL)
 Lowest-observed-adverse-effect level (LOAEL)
 Up-and-down procedure

Related measures 
 TCID50 Tissue Culture Infective Dosage
 Plaque forming units (pfu)

References

External links 
 Canadian Centre for Occupational Health and Safety
 

Animal testing
Concentration indicators
Mathematics in medicine
Toxicology